William Merriam was a member of the Wisconsin State Assembly.

Biography
Merriam was born on September 28, 1894, in Delavan, Wisconsin. He graduated from high school in Wisconsin Rapids, Wisconsin and from Iowa State University. During World War I, he served in the United States Army.

Political career
Merriam was elected to the Assembly in 1956 and re-elected in 1958. He was a Republican.

References

People from Delavan, Wisconsin
People from Wisconsin Rapids, Wisconsin
Republican Party members of the Wisconsin State Assembly
Military personnel from Wisconsin
United States Army soldiers
United States Army personnel of World War I
Iowa State University alumni
1894 births
Year of death missing